Jelena Dokic was the defending champion, but lost in semifinals to Kim Clijsters.

Serena Williams won the title by defeating Kim Clijsters 2–6, 6–3, 6–3 in the final.

Seeds
The first four seeds received a bye into the second round.

Draw

Finals

Top half

Bottom half

References

External links
 Official results archive (ITF)
 Official results archive (WTA)

Singles
Toyota Princess Cup - Singles